The Nativity of the Blessed Virgin Mary Catholic Church is a historic Catholic church in Cassella, an unincorporated community in Mercer County, Ohio, United States.  One of several Catholic churches in Marion Township, it has been designated a historic site because of its well-preserved nineteenth-century architecture.

Parish history

Founded in 1847, Nativity parish was served from its earliest years by itinerant priests of the Society of the Precious Blood.  Soon after the parish's formation, a small frame church building was erected on the northeastern corner of the intersection of what is now Cassella-Montezuma Road and State Route 119.  The parish was reduced by the formation of St. Francis parish in Cranberry Prairie: due to the difficulty of travelling to Cassella, the Catholics in the western part of the parish requested a separate church, and St. Francis parish was founded in 1858.

Despite the creation of St. Francis' Church, the original frame church had become too small by the late 1850s.  Starting in 1858, the parishioners spent $6,000 to construct a replacement brick structure on the southeastern corner of the intersection.  Other buildings were constructed around the church, including a large house for the pastor.

Today, Nativity remains an active parish of the Archdiocese of Cincinnati.  It is part of the Marion Catholic Community cluster, along with Precious Blood parish in Chickasaw, St. Sebastian parish in Sebastian, St. Rose parish in St. Rose, and St. John the Baptist parish in Maria Stein.  The entire cluster is a part of the St. Marys Deanery.

Buildings
Several buildings owned by or related to the parish are located at Cassella's primary intersection.  Centered on the parish church, these buildings were completed over a period of more than fifty years.

Church
The church building is a rectangular single-story structure, three bays wide on the front and four bays long on the sides.  Built on a stone foundation with a basement, the walls are of brick covered with stone, and the building is covered with a gabled roof of asphalt.  Begun in 1858, the church was consecrated in August, 1862.  The High Gothic Revival church was greatly modified after an 1888 fire that nearly destroyed the original structure: the original walls survived, badly burnt, but the interior was destroyed.  Although the church was soon rebuilt at a cost of $16,000, the exterior displayed signs of fire for many years; only in 1915 was the damage hidden, as travelling German craftsmen covered it with the cut stone exterior that remains in place today.

Dominating the church's facade is a square tower at the front; topped with a cupola above an arch-shaped tracery window, it is decorated with ornamental columns.  Worshippers enter the church through a large doorway in the tower's base.  This tower was a later addition to the church: when it was first built, it was a small simple structure, similar to Holy Family Catholic Church in Frenchtown to the south.  The inclusion of a tall tower in the design of St. Aloysius' Catholic Church in Carthagena, completed in 1877, was revolutionary in the region — later churches were built with such towers, and many existing churches (including Nativity) were modified by the addition of a tall tower.  The tall Gothic Revival towers of many of these churches, including Nativity, has caused locals to nickname the region the "Land of the Cross-Tipped Churches."

Architectural historians have classified the Cross-Tipped Churches into four generations.  Nativity's first parish church was typical of the first generation of churches, which were typically small frame buildings; only the brick St. John's Church in Fryburg has survived from this generation without significant modifications.  Nativity is one of the oldest second-generation churches, which were generally small rectangular brick buildings such as Holy Family; although it was built during the years of the first generation, it assumed its present condition after the 1888 fire.

Rectory
Located adjacent to the church to the east is a large rectory that was constructed in 1904.  A square two-story building, its walls are of brick laid in a common bond; they rest on an ashlar foundation and are topped with a hip roof of asphalt shingles.  Among its notable architectural features are a large dormer window above the first-story verandah porch, an imbricated gable with a Palladian window, and an octagonal tower on the house's northwestern corner.  The building's overall architecture is transitional between styles, with some Gothic Revival elements.

In the parish's first ten years, Mass was celebrated by errant priests who stayed at nearby convents during their visits; accordingly, there was no need for a rectory.  Even after the parish was granted a settled pastor, he had no house; priests in the region typically lived at the nearby convents.  This situation changed in the earliest years of the twentieth century, when an archiepiscopal directive required all parishes in the Archdiocese of Cincinnati to construct rectories for their pastors.  The resulting houses are generally two-story rectangular brick structures with hip roofs and verandahs; the rectory at Cassella is one of the best-preserved examples of the period.

Other structures

Two former parish schools lie along Cassella-Montezuma Road, immediately south of the church.  These one-room schools share several architectural features, including double round windows and double doors on their facades.  Many parishes in the region built schools for their children; while many one-room schools have been demolished or greatly changed, others have been converted into parish halls or other non-scholastic types of buildings.

Built in 1850 and known as the "Gruenwald Convent," it once housed sixty nuns. This building no longer functions as a convent.

Recognition

In 1977, Nativity Church and its rectory were recorded by the Ohio Historic Inventory, a historic preservation survey conducted by the Ohio Historical Society.  Although the survey observed that no efforts were being made toward the preservation of the buildings, both were classified as being in good condition on the interior and the exterior, and no threats to their continued existence could be found.  Two years later, the church and rectory were listed together on the National Register of Historic Places because of their well-preserved historic architecture.  Thirty-two other properties, including twenty-five other churches, were listed on the Register at the same time as part of a multiple property submission of Precious Blood-related buildings in far western Ohio.  Included among these buildings were the Gruenwald Convent and most of the other churches of the Marion Catholic Community; Precious Blood Church in Chickasaw was not included, but its school and rectory were listed.

References

External links

Marion Catholic Community

Roman Catholic churches completed in 1858
Houses completed in 1904
19th-century Roman Catholic church buildings in the United States
Churches in the Land of the Cross-Tipped Churches
Gothic Revival church buildings in Ohio
Churches in Mercer County, Ohio
National Register of Historic Places in Mercer County, Ohio
Religious organizations established in 1847
Churches in the Roman Catholic Archdiocese of Cincinnati
1847 establishments in Ohio